The Avalon Boys were a quartet of singers popular in the 1930s.  They appeared in a number of comedy films and had a memorable role in Laurel and Hardy's Way Out West.

Members
Chill Wills (bass)
Art Greene
Walter Weyland Trask (guitar), b. 26 November 1911, d. 27 June 1999 
Don Brookins (baritone, arranger, and piano) b. 29 January 1909 - d. 4 November 1994

Film appearances
It's a Gift (1934)
Bar 20 Rides Again (1935)
Call of the Prairie (1936)
Anything Goes (1936)
Way Out West (1937)
Hideaway Girl (1937)

External links

Hopalong Cassidy Music

American vocal groups